Martin McNamara was a member of the Wisconsin State Assembly during the 1872 session. Other positions he held include Chairman (similar to Mayor) of Maple Grove, Manitowoc County, Wisconsin in 1866. He was a Democrat. McNamara was born on November 7, 1811 in County Clare, Ireland.

References

Politicians from County Clare
Irish emigrants to the United States (before 1923)
People from Manitowoc County, Wisconsin
Mayors of places in Wisconsin
1811 births
Year of death missing
Democratic Party members of the Wisconsin State Assembly